The Southern Death Cult is a compilation album by British gothic rock band Southern Death Cult. It is a collection of studio outtakes, demos and live recordings by the band, released originally in 1983, after the band had broken up.

1983 release
The first edition of the compilation album The Southern Death Cult was released by Beggars Banquet Records in 1983. It was released in the United Kingdom in LP (catalogue number BEGA 46) and cassette (catalogue number BEGC 46) formats. The liner notes read:
Southern Death Cult disbanded before recording their first album, this LP has been compiled by them from existing session and live material and alternate recordings.

The original track listing of the album (both formats) is as follows:

 A1 "All Glory" (i)
 A2 "Fatman" (ii)
 A3 "Today" (i)
 A4 "False Faces" (iii)
 A5 "The Crypt" (iv)
 B1 "Crow" (v)
 B2 "Faith" (v)
 B3 "Vivisection" (v)
 B4 "Apache" (iii)
 B5 "Moya" (ii)

 (i) Recorded 21 May 1982 for the John Peel show on BBC Radio 1 at Maida Vale 4 studio. Produced by John Owen Williams. Engineered by Martin Colley. First broadcast on 10 June 1982. During the original Peel session, four tracks were recorded: "Fatman", "Today", "False Faces" and "All Glory". The other two tracks ("Fatman" and "False Faces") have never been released.
 (ii) Recorded at The Playground. Produced and engineered by Mike Hedges. Remix by John Brand.
 (iii) Recorded 20 January 1983 for the David Jensen show on BBC Radio 1 at Maida Vale 4 studio. Produced by John Sparrow. Engineered by Martyn Parker. First broadcast on 24 January 1983.
 (iv) Recorded at Manchester Square. Engineered by Pat Staples.
 (v) Recorded live at Rafters, Manchester, England on 13 December 1982.

1988 reissue

In June 1988, Beggars Banquet reissued the album The Southern Death Cult as part of its "LOWDOWN Special Low Price" promotion. This release was only issued in the UK and in vinyl (catalogue number BBL 46) and cassette (catalogue number BBLC 46) formats. The track listing remained the same as the original release. This reissue had no new material nor was it remastered.

1987 Japan-only release
In 1987, the album was released in compact disc format for the first time. It was only released in Japan on the Victor label (catalogue number VDP-1283). The vinyl LP was released by Sounds Marketing System (catalogue number SP25 5079). The track listing remained the same as the original album release. No new material was added nor was this release remastered.

1988 reissue
In 1988, Beggars Banquet began reissuing older material by the Cult for the first time in CD format. These reissues included early material such as the Death Cult recordings and the Southern Death Cult material that, up until this point, had never been released on CD in the UK. This release was only issued in the UK (catalogue number BBL 46 CD) and Canada on the PolyGram label (catalogue number 834 691-2). Additional tracks were added to the original album, but the material was not remastered. The tracklisting was as follows:

 "Fatman" (i)
 "Moya" (i)
 "The Girl" (i)
 "All Glory" (ii)
 "Today" (ii)
 "False Faces" (iii)
 "Flowers in the Forest" (iii)
 "Patriot" (iii)
 "The Crypt" (iv)
 "Crow" (v)
 "Faith" (v)
 "Vivisection" (v)
 "Apache" (iii)
 "Moya" (vi)
 "Fatman" (vi)

 (i) Originally released in December 1982 as a 12-inch single titled The Southern Death Cult on Situation Two (catalogue number SIT 19T). Produced by Mick Glossop.
 (ii) Recorded 21 May 1982 for the John Peel show on BBC Radio 1 at Maida Vale 4 studio. Produced by John Owen Williams. Engineered by Martin Colley. First broadcast on 10 June 1982. During the original Peel session, four tracks were recorded: "Fatman", "Today", "False Faces" and "All Glory". The other two tracks ("Fatman" and "False Faces") have never been released.
 (iii) Recorded 20 January 1983 for the David Jensen show on BBC Radio 1 at Maida Vale 4 studio. Produced by John Sparrow. Engineered by Martyn Parker. First broadcast on 24 January 1983.
 (iv) Recorded at Manchester Square. Engineered by Pat Staples.
 (v) Recorded live at Rafters, Manchester, England on 13 December 1982.
 (vi) Recorded at The Playground. Produced and engineered by Mike Hedges. Remix by John Brand.

1996 remaster
In August 1996, the material contained on the 1988 The Southern Death Cult CD was remastered and released worldwide (and for the first time ever in the United States) by Beggars Banquet. It was only issued on CD (catalogue number BBL 46 CD). No new material was added, but the liner notes were reworked and new photographs were added.

Foreign releases
The album The Southern Death Cult has been released in a number of foreign countries at different times in different formats. The following is a partial list:

 Australia in LP format on Virgin (catalogue number BEGA). Release date unknown.
 Belgium in LP format on Virgin (catalogue number BEGA 46). Release date unknown 
 Brazil in LP format on RCA [catalogue number 1308019). Release date unknown.
 Canada in LP format on PolyGram [catalogue number 834 691-1). Release date unknown.
 Japan in LP format on Sounds Marketing System (catalogue number SP25 5079). Released sometime in 1983.

Personnel
Southern Death Cult
 Ian Robert Astbury - vocals
 David "Buzz" Burroughs - guitars
 Barry Jepson - bass
 Haq Nawaz "Aky" Qureshi - drums

1983 compilation albums
Southern Death Cult albums
Beggars Banquet Records compilation albums